Martin Marić (born 19 April 1984) is a Croatian track and field athlete who competes in the discus throw. He also has  in the javelin throw, achieved in May 2006. Martin Marić has been a throws coach at the University of Virginia Since 2012. Maric spent the springs of 2010 and 2011 as a volunteer assistant coach at the University of Florida.

World Anti-Doping Agency
In August 2015, World Anti-Doping Agency published a "Prohibited Association list". Martin Marić is one of the 130 athletes prohibited from associating in Track and Field athletics. Martin's ban last through 2016.

IAAF
Martin Marić tested positive for ostarine in July 2014, a SARM. Martin Marić was given a two-year ban from Track and Field athletics through 5 August 2016.

Professional
Martin Marić represented Croatia at the 2013 World Championships in Athletics – Men's discus throw in Moscow, Russia. Martin placed 27th at 2011 World Championships in Athletics – Men's discus throw in 60.61 meters.

Martin Maric represented Croatia at the 2012 Olympic Games. Martin placed 17th with a 62.87 meters.

Martin Marić represented Croatia at the 2011 World Championships in Athletics – Men's discus throw in Daegu, South Korea. Martin placed 27th at 2011 World Championships in Athletics – Men's discus throw in 60.61 meters.

Martin Marić represented Croatia at the Athletics at the 2009 Summer Universiade also called 2009 World University Games. Martin placed 7th at Athletics at the 2009 Summer Universiade – Men's discus throw in 58.37 meters.

Martin Maric also competed at the 2008 Olympic Games, but without reaching the final placing 29th with a 59.25 meters.

Martin Marić represented Croatia at the Athletics at the 2007 Summer Universiade – Men's discus throw. Martin placed 8th at Athletics at the 2007 Summer Universiade – Men's discus throw in 56.32 meters.

Martin Marić finished thirteenth at the 2001 World Youth Championships and won the silver medal at the 2003 European Junior Championships.

NCAA
As a competitor for the University of Georgia, Martin Marić attain 2006 All-American status in the discus by placing 6th at the NCAA Men's Division I Outdoor Track and Field Championships. In the javelin, Maric registered a throw of 237–3 feet, which improves his own seventh-longest mark in Georgia Bulldogs and Lady Bulldogs history.

After transferring to the University of California, he attained All-American Status in the discus by placing 8th at the National Collegiate Athletic Association championships. In his senior campaign, Martin won the NCAA Division I national collegiate championships by throwing the discus 196-3, beating Ryan Whiting of Arizona State Sun Devils by only  on his final throw.

Maric graduated from California with a bachelor's degree in Political Economy of Industrial Societies in 2009.

Personal
Marić was born in Belgrade and is native of Split, Croatia.

Competition record

References

External links 
 
 

1984 births
Living people
Athletes from Belgrade
Croatian male discus throwers
Olympic athletes of Croatia
Athletes (track and field) at the 2008 Summer Olympics
Athletes (track and field) at the 2012 Summer Olympics
World Athletics Championships athletes for Croatia
Mediterranean Games gold medalists for Croatia
Athletes (track and field) at the 2013 Mediterranean Games
Doping cases in athletics
Croatian sportspeople in doping cases
Mediterranean Games medalists in athletics
21st-century Croatian people